Lord's No. 1 Ground also known as Lord's was a cricket ground in Durban, South Africa. The ground is believed to have been located on the current site of railway tracks leading to Durban railway station. It hosted 4 matches of Test cricket between 1910 and 1921 with the 2nd Test in 1909/10 and the 1st and 4th Tests in 1913/14, all between South Africa and England, and the 1st Test in 1921/22 between South Africa and Australia. The ground was demolished in 1922.

International centuries
Four Test centuries were scored on the ground.

Five-wicket hauls
Nine five-wicket hauls were taken in the four Test matches played on the ground. The ground no longer exists.

See also 

 List of Test cricket grounds
 Sahara Stadium Kingsmead

Notes

References

External links 

 cricketarchive
 espncricinfo

Cricket grounds in South Africa
Sports venues in Durban
Test cricket grounds in South Africa
1910 establishments in South Africa
Defunct cricket grounds in South Africa
Sports venues demolished in 1922